The De Gasperi VII Cabinet held office in the Italian Republic from 26 July 1951 until 16 July 1953, a total of 721 days, or 1 year, 11 months and 20 days.

Party breakdown
 Christian Democracy (DC): prime minister, deputy prime minister, 12 ministers, 33 undersecretaries
 Italian Republican Party (PRI): 3 ministers, 3 undersecretaries

Composition

References

Italian governments
1951 establishments in Italy
1953 disestablishments in Italy
Cabinets established in 1951
Cabinets disestablished in 1951
De Gasperi 7 Cabinet